Luis Franco may refer to:

 Luis Franco (writer) (1898–1988), Argentine writer, essayist and poet
 Luis Franco (boxer) (born 1982), Cuban boxer
 Luis Ernesto Franco (born 1983), Mexican actor
 Luis Franco (Mexican footballer) (born 1993), Mexican football midfielder
 Luis Franco (Paraguayan footballer) (born 1999), Paraguayan football goalkeeper